Fernando da Piedade Dias dos Santos (born 5 March 1950), known as Nandó, is an Angolan politician who was the first vice president of Angola from February 2010 to September 2012. He was the prime minister of Angola from 2002 to 2008 and president of the National Assembly of Angola from 2008 to 2010. He has again served as president of the National Assembly from 2012 to 2022.

Background
Piedade is a cousin of President José Eduardo dos Santos. His parents emigrated to Angola from São Tomé and Príncipe.  He obtained a BA in Law in 2009 at Agostinho Neto University in Angola.

In 1971, Piedade joined the Popular Movement for the Liberation of Angola (MPLA). Following Angola's independence from Portugal in 1975 he began a career in the People's Police Corps of Angola, becoming a division head in 1978. In 1981 he moved to the Ministry of the Interior, becoming Deputy Minister in 1984. The following year he was elected as a member of the MPLA-Workers' Party congress and given the rank of colonel in the Angolan military. He later became a member of the People's Assembly, beginning a succession of appointments to government ministerial posts.

After having served as Interior Minister since 1999, Piedade was appointed as Prime Minister in November 2002 and took office on December 6, 2002. The office of Prime Minister had previously been unoccupied for three years.

Piadade was the 14th candidate on the MPLA's national list in the September 2008 legislative election. In the election, the MPLA won an overwhelming majority, and Piedade was elected to a seat in the National Assembly.

Following the 2008 election, the MPLA Political Bureau chose Piedade to become the President of the National Assembly on September 26, 2008. It also chose Paulo Kassoma to replace Piedade as Prime Minister. On September 30, the newly elected members of the National Assembly met and were sworn in; Piedade was elected as President of the National Assembly on this occasion, receiving 211 votes in favor and three opposed.

On January 21, 2010, the National Assembly approved a new constitution that would increase presidential powers, eliminate the office of Prime Minister, and eliminate popular elections for the office of President. Piedade described the National Assembly's adoption of the constitution as a "historic moment". President dos Santos then appointed Piedade to the newly established office of Vice-President of Angola on February 3, 2010. Having long served as a close and powerful associate of dos Santos, his appointment as Vice-President made it appear more likely that he was being envisioned as the eventual successor to dos Santos. However, dos Santos had already been designated as the MPLA candidate for President in 2012, suggesting that he had no intention of retiring.

In 2012, Manuel Vicente, who had headed the state oil company Sonangol, was believed to have been selected by the President as his likely successor. Vicente was designated as the second candidate on the MPLA's list of parliamentary candidates, making him the party's nominee for the post of Vice-President. Following the MLPA's victory in the 2012 legislative election, Vicente took office as Vice President on 26 September 2012, succeeding Piedade. A day later, on 27 September 2012, Piedade was instead elected as President of the National Assembly.

References

Prime Ministers of Angola
Presidents of the National Assembly (Angola)
1950 births
Living people
Vice presidents of Angola
Interior ministers of Angola
MPLA politicians
Agostinho Neto University alumni
21st-century Angolan politicians